The 2014–15 UMass Minutemen basketball team represented the University of Massachusetts Amherst during the 2014–15 NCAA Division I men's basketball season. The Minutemen, led by seventh year head coach Derek Kellogg, played their home games at the William D. Mullins Memorial Center and were members of the Atlantic 10 Conference. They finished the season 17–15, 10–8 in A-10 play to finish in a three-way tie for sixth place. They lost in the second round of the A-10 tournament to La Salle.

Previous season
The Minutemen finished the season with an overall record of 24–9, with a record of 10–6 in the Atlantic 10 regular season for a tie for a fifth-place finish. In the 2014 Atlantic 10 tournament, the Minutemen were defeated by George Washington, 85–77 in the quarterfinals. They received an at-large bid to the 2014 NCAA Men's Division I Basketball Tournament which is their first time since 1998. They lost in the second round to Tennessee.

Departures

Incoming recruits

Roster

Schedule

|-
!colspan=9 style="background:#881c1c; color:#FFFFFF;"| Exhibition

|-
!colspan=9 style="background:#881C1C; color:white;"| Non-conference regular Season

|-
!colspan=9 style="background:#881C1C; color:white;"| Atlantic 10 regular Season

|-
!colspan=9 style="background:#881c1c; color:#FFFFFF;"| Atlantic 10 tournament

See also
 2014–15 UMass Minutewomen basketball team

References

UMass Minutemen basketball seasons
Umass